Megachile larochei is a species of bee in the family Megachilidae. It was described by Tkalcu in 1994.

References

Larochei
Insects described in 1994